Jack and the Beanstalk is a 1917 American silent fantasy film directed by Chester Franklin and Sidney Franklin and starring Francis Carpenter, Virginia Lee Corbin, and Violet Radcliffe.

Main cast
 Francis Carpenter as Francis / Jack 
 Virginia Lee Corbin as Virginia / Princess Regina 
 Violet Radcliffe as Prince Rudolpho 
 Carmen De Rue as The King of Cornwall 
 Jim G. Tarver as Giant 
 Vera Lewis as The Giantess 
 Ralph Lewis as Francis' Father 
 Eleanor Washington as Francis' Mother 
 Ione Glennon as Virginia's Mother

References

Bibliography
 Solomon, Aubrey. The Fox Film Corporation, 1915-1935: A History and Filmography. McFarland, 2011.

External links

1917 films
1910s fantasy films
1910s English-language films
American silent feature films
American fantasy films
American black-and-white films
Films directed by Chester Franklin
Films directed by Sidney Franklin
Fox Film films
1910s American films